Suraj Chapagain (born 16 January 1984)
is a Nepalese comedy actor, script writer, and director. He is one of the main characters of the Nepalese TV series Meri Bassai, named "Bandre".

Early life 
Chapagain was born on 16 January 1984 in Jhapa, Nepal. His father died when he was six years old. After studying at Shree Sharswati Higher Secondary School up to 10th grade, he ran away from home to Kathmandu with his friends and started as a sales man, hoping to become a professional actor and a comedian someday.

Career

Chapagain started his career from a hit comedy show called Hijo Aja Kaa Kura. He also worked in Thorai Bhaye Pugisari.  After that, he started to act in Meri Bassai as the character "Bandre", the role for which he became well known. He has also visited many places around the world to perform comedy.

Filmography

Television
 Hijo Aja Kaa Kura 
 Thorai Bhaye Pugisari 
 Meri Bassai
 Gaai Ki Trishul

References

1984 births
Living people
People from Jhapa District
Nepalese male actors
Nepalese screenwriters
Nepalese male comedians
21st-century Nepalese screenwriters
Khas people